Wrestedt is a municipality in the district of Uelzen, in Lower Saxony, Germany. It is situated approximately 7 km south of Uelzen. Wrestedt is the seat of the Samtgemeinde ("collective municipality") Aue, which consists of the municipalities Bad Bodenteich, Lüder, Soltendieck, and Wrestedt.

References

External links
Village website

Uelzen (district)